Madame Clicquot, née Barbe-Nicole Ponsardin, Widow Clicquot or Veuve Clicquot  (16 December 1777 – 29 July 1866), known as the "Grande Dame of Champagne", was a French Champagne producer. She took on her husband's wine business when widowed at 27. Under her ownership, and her skill with wine, the company developed early champagne using a novel technique. The brand and company of Veuve Clicquot Ponsardin still bears her name.

Biography
Barbe-Nicole Ponsardin, born 16 December 1777 in Reims, was the daughter of a wealthy father, Ponce Jean Nicolas Philippe Ponsardin (from 1813, Baron Ponsardin), a textile manufacturer and politician. Her mother was Jeanne Josephe Marie-Clémentine Letertre-Huart.

She married François Clicquot at the age of 21. Her husband died six years later leaving her a widow at 27 with a six year old daughter Clémentine. Her husband's death may have been suicide, but it was attributed to typhoid. Madame was wealthy by virtue of her very well connected family. Napoleon and Josephine had both stayed at her family's home (L'Hotel Ponsardin was the name of their household, not literally a hotel). Her father was made mayor of Reims by Napoleon's decree.

Her husband François died in 1805, leaving his widow (veuve in French) in control of a company variously involved in banking, wool trading, and champagne production. Under Madame Clicquot's control, the house focused entirely on champagne, and thrived using funds supplied by her father-in-law. Under her management and her skill with wine, the company developed early champagne using a novel technique called riddling. Prior to this invention the second fermentation of wine to create champagne resulted in a very sweet wine with large bubbles and sediment from the remains of the yeast used in the fermentation in the bottle (which creates the bubbles in the wine) resulting in a cloudy wine.

She still used the original English technique of adding sugar, but after this second fermentation was complete the bottles were held upside down. The bottles were regularly turned so that the dead yeast would all gather near the cork (riddling). Once the settling was complete, the wine near the cork was removed, followed by an addition of wine to refill the bottle.

The musical "Clicquot, A Revolutionary Musical" written by Lisette Glodowski and Richard C. Walter was written about Madame Clicquot's life

Legacy
Clicquot died 29 July 1866, in Boursault. 
She had built the Neo-Renaissance style Château de Boursault in honor of the marriage of her granddaughter Marie Clémentine de Chevigné to Louis de Mortemart-Rochechouart in 1839. Anne de Rochechouart de Mortemart inherited the chateau on Madame Clicquot's death in 1866.
Anne was the daughter of Marie Clémentine and Louis.

References

19th-century French businesspeople
19th-century French businesswomen
Champagne producers
1777 births
1866 deaths
Business people from Reims